Nedžad Sinanović (born 29 January 1983) is a Bosnian former basketball player.

Professional career
In 2003, Sinanović was drafted by the Portland Trail Blazers as the 54th overall selection of the 2003 NBA draft. Since then, he has played professionally in Belgium, Spain, Germany and Iran.

On 30 September 2012, Sinanović was the MVP of round 1 of the 2012–13 ACB season.

In April 2014, he left Valladolid for Petrochimi Bandar Imam BC.

In August 2012, Sinanović made his debut with the Bosnia and Herzegovina national team during the qualifiers for the 2013 FIBA Eurobasket.

References

External links
Euroleague.net Profile
ACB.com Profile 
 FIBA.com Profile

1983 births
Living people
Baloncesto Málaga players
Bosnia and Herzegovina expatriate basketball people in Germany
Bosnia and Herzegovina expatriate basketball people in Spain
Bosnia and Herzegovina expatriate basketball people in Belgium
Bosnia and Herzegovina men's basketball players
Bosniaks of Bosnia and Herzegovina
CB Axarquía players
CB Valladolid players
Centers (basketball)
Köln 99ers players
Liga ACB players
People from Zavidovići
Petrochimi Bandar Imam BC players
Portland Trail Blazers draft picks
RBC Pepinster players
Real Madrid Baloncesto players